Gladden is both a surname and a given name. Notable people with the name include:

Surname
 Alicia Gladden (1985–2013), American women's basketball player
 Eddie Gladden (1937-2003), American jazz drummer
 Dan Gladden (1957-), American former Major League Baseball player
 Lisa A. Gladden (1964-), American politician from Maryland
 Lynn Gladden, British chemical engineer
 Texas Gladden (1895-1967), American folk singer from Saltville, Virginia
 Washington Gladden (1836-1918), American Congregational church pastor

Given name
 Gladden Bishop (1809—1864), leader in the Latter Day Saint movement
 Gladden James (1888–1948), American film actor
 Gladden Dye, head college football coach for the Northwest Missouri State University Bearcats